Limitless is a live album from Planetshakers, released by Planetshakers Ministries International and Integrity Music on January 15, 2013.

Critical reception

Awarding the album four and a half stars from Worship Leader, Andrea Hunter states, "Planetshakers are back to engender seismic activity". Doug Holland, rating the album an eight out of ten for Cross Rhythms, writes, "These elements combine to deliver a collection which captures an intense, high-energy worship experience, with memorable anthems and hooky choruses." Giving the album three and a half stars at New Release Today, Jonathan J. Francesco says, "The music's safe and catchy, and often musically rewarding. It's a pleasantly surprising musical offering." Jono Davies, indicating in a four star review by Louder Than the Music, describes, "this is a solid worship album". Signaling in a two star review from Indie Vision Music, Jonathan Andre cautions, "Sadly, the rest of the album pales in comparison to my favourite standout track. Despite the great musical quality full of electronic beats and strong vibrant guitars; the lyrical depth with many of these tracks leaves much to be desired."

Awards and accolades
The song, "The Anthem", was No. 18 on the Worship Leader's Top 20 Songs of 2013 list.

Track listing

Musicians
Andy Harrison – drums
Joth Hunt - vocals, electric guitar
Samantha Evans - vocals
Liz Webber - vocals
Mike Webber - drums
Scott Lim - keyboard
Mark Peric - bass guitar

Chart performance

References

2013 live albums
Planetshakers albums